NGC 7635, also known as the Bubble Nebula, Sharpless 162, or Caldwell 11, is an H II region emission nebula in the constellation Cassiopeia. It lies close to the direction of the open cluster Messier 52. The "bubble" is created by the stellar wind from a massive hot, 8.7 magnitude young central star, SAO 20575 (BD+60°2522). The nebula is near a giant molecular cloud which contains the expansion of the bubble nebula while itself being excited by the hot central star, causing it to glow. It was discovered in 1787 by William Herschel.

Amateur observation 

With an 8 or  telescope, the nebula is visible as an extremely faint and large shell around the star. The nearby 7th magnitude star on the west hinders observation, but one can view the nebula using averted vision. Using a 16 to  scope, one can see that the faint nebula is irregular, being elongated in the north south direction.

See also 
 Lists of nebulae

Notes

References

External links 

 NGC7635 The Bubble Nebula
 
 Bubble Nebula at Constellation Guide

H II regions
Emission nebulae
Cassiopeia (constellation)
7635
Sharpless objects
011b
Astronomical objects discovered in 1787